Daruvu: Sound Of Mass is a 2012 Indian Telugu-language fantasy action comedy film written and directed by Siva, produced by Burugupalli Siva Rama Krishna under Sri Venkateswara Entertainments banner and starring Ravi Teja and Taapsee in lead roles. The soundtrack of the film is composed by Vijay Antony, while the cinematography is handled by Vetrivel. Anil Ravipudi penned the dialogues and Gautham Raju handled the editing department. The film is inspired from Yamudiki Mogudu. The movie was an average at box office. 

The movie was remade in Odia as Ashok Samrat.

Plot
The film's story is similar to fantasy films like Yamagola, Yamudiki Mogudu, Yamaleela, and Yamadonga.

Bullet Raja (Ravi Teja) is a small-time crook with a good heart. He bumps into Swetha (Taapsee) at a function and falls in love with her, but she is already engaged to Harbour Babu (Sushant Singh), a powerful local goon. One day, using Swetha's dance master Vidya Balan (Brahmanandam), Raja and Swetha manage to run away from Babu to reach a hilltop, but Babu tracks them down and is severely beaten by Raja. At the last moment, Babu uses his Scorpio car to hit Raja off the hilltop. Raja clings on to a branch growing on the hill but slips off it and falls down, yet still manages to survive. Just then, Chitragupta (M. S. Narayana) changes the story, and the car that was stuck on the edge of the hill falls down on top of Raja, and as he was crushed. The Scorpio car blasts, thus killing him.

Raja heads to Yamalokam, where he realizes that his life has unjustly been terminated by Chitragupta, and so he picks up a fight with Yamadharma Raja (Prabhu). A helpless Yama gives Bullet Raja three options. Either he could be a Chinese warrior who was to die two days later, a terrorist who also has the same life span, or greedy, evil, and corrupt Home Minister of Andhra Pradesh, Ravindra (Ravi Teja), who decides to turn over a new leaf after he realizes the affection and support that the public has for him, but he is killed by his associates Balram (Sayaji Shinde), Shantaram (Avinash), and Pavitrananda (Raghu Babu). Thus, Raja decides to enter Ravindra, who seemed the most normal among them. After Raja enters into Ravindra's body, he beats up Ravindra's assassins and kills them with the help of Yamakinkaras (servants of the lord Yama), Deceives Shantaram, Balaram and Pavitrananda by usurping their assets and throwing them behind bars and reforms the political ecosystem of the ruling party. The trio (Shantaram, Balaram and Pavitrananda) receive bail with the help of Harbour Babu and try to kill Ravindra (Raja), but the trio gets reformed due to the social welfare conducted by Ravindra (Raja) with their confiscated assets. Harbour Babu gets arrested, and when Ravindra (Raja) was about to get home he was shot by a labourer (who was not able to receive justice due to some mishap when Ravindra was alive). Ravindra (Raja) survives due to his good deeds, which he did from the beginning. Ravindra (Raja) gets blessings from Lord Yama as he did the righteous job by supporting the people.

Cast

Production

Development
Director Siva who previously made films like Souryam, Sankham and Siruthai started working on this film in early 2011. Burugupalli Siva Rama Krishna who previously produced films like Thammudu, Sahasa Veerudu Sagara Kanya and Yuvaraju signed Ravi Teja for the film. The film was officially launched on 18 August 2011 in Hyderabad, India. After several months of filming, in January 2012 it was announced that the film was titled Daruvu. In February 2012, filming was disrupted by Telangana activists. The incident happened when the unit was filming Osmania University campus, Hyderabad. The activists raising slogans rammed onto the location and damaged the furniture and film equipment thus forcing the crew to call off the shoot.

Casting
Ravi Teja was the first actor who was cast in the film. In October 2011, it was announced that Taapsee Pannu who earlier worked with Ravi Teja in Veera was signed for the film. The film is a socio-fantasy flick dealing with Yama Dharmaraju and Yamalokam. Veteran actor Kaikala Satyanarayana who was famous for his portrayal of Yama Dharmaraju in several films was cast for that role. Tamil actor Prabhu was cast for the role of Yama Dharmaraju's son. Popular Kannada actor Avinash and Marathi actor Sayaji Shinde were cast for important roles in the film. Top comedians of Telugu cinema like Bramhanandam, M. S. Narayana, Raghu Babu, Dharmavarapu Subramanyam, Srinivas Reddy and Vennela Kishore were also cast for vital roles in the film.

Filming
After the film was launched in August 2011, first schedule of filming began in November 2011. Filming took place in Hyderabad and Chennai. Second schedule of filming began on 11 December 2011. Filming took place in Hyderabad, Badami and Bangkok. In January 2012, it was announced that 60% of the filming was completed. It was reported that huge sets of Yamalokam were specially designed and constructed in Ramoji Film City for the film. Filming took place in Ramoji Film City till 3 February 2012 after which three songs were shot from 5 February 2012 till 20 February 2012 in Bangkok. On 5 March 2012 it was announced that the filming will completed by 16 March 2012 and post-production beginning soon after that. He is looking forward to Bollywood too.

Release
The movie was scheduled for a worldwide release on 4 May 2012 but got postponed to 18 May 2012 due to delay in the post production work. The film was again postponed and fixed, released on 25 May 2012. The film was given a U/A certificate by the CBFC.

Critical reception

The movie met with negative reviews, however praising Ravi Teja's Performance. Rediff gave a review stating "Daruvu may be lapped up by Ravi Teja fans but others may find it pretty dreary. If the tagline 'Sound of Mass' means that it's right for the masses, then it's got that right; a discerning audience won't find anything to cheer about. NDTV gave a review stating "Daruvu suffers from gaps in reason and logic. As a socio fantasy film, it lives on as a punch line of bad movie jokes. Even Ravi Teja's comic timing and Taapsee's simpering can't resurrect a film that has gaping plot holes you could fall into." IBN Live gave a review stating "Some people make films for themselves, and some others for juveniles. 'Daruvu' is a film made for the low brow. Even those given to mean enjoyment in an inebriated condition in the most godless hamlet would find this film cheap." greatandhra.com gave a review stating "Overall, this is a film for those who want to see a good act from Ravi Teja but if you are expecting a wholesome entertainer then it will completely disappoint you. Muta Mestri + Yama Donga + Yamudiki Mogudu = Daruvu." Oneindia Entertainment gave a review stating "Daruvu is just like any other movie of Ravi Teja. It looks like an old film narrated in a new way, an old wine in a new bottle of course. Like the old wine, which would always be very tasty as many years you keep in a bottle, in the same way Ravi Teja's comedy abilities would always make the audiences happy." 123telugu.com gave a review stating "Ravi Teja continues to amaze with his incredible energy levels. His best performance comes when he portrays the role of the Home Minister with negative shades. There is a lot of potential in this fine actor and someone needs to tap that but there is not much he can do when there are a host of other issues with the film. Poor graphics, lengthy narration and bad music are glaring problems. There are a few good moments in the film, but the key word here is 'few'. Watch the movie without any expectations only if you are a Ravi Teja fan." SuperGoodMovies.com gave a review stating "If you are looking for Raviteja's film without much logic and story, Daruvu may appeal to you. On the entertainment front it fails to deliver the goods." Cinegoer.com gave a review stating "Daruvu is a downright delusional film for Ravi Teja fans. Clichéd is an over used term for this story, the director takes a couple of plots and dumps it in a blender with the usual consistent Ravi Teja energy and Brahmi syrup that has long passed the expiry date."

Box office
The film has completed 50 days on 13 July 2012 in 56 centers. The movie was an average at the box-office.

Soundtrack
The audio of the film was released on 18 April 2012 and the launch was held at Prasad labs in Hyderabad on the same day. The soundtrack of the film was composed by Vijay Antony. The lyrics for the songs were written by Bhaskarabhatla, Ramajogayya Sastry, Suddala Ashok Teja and Basha Sri. Except "Thom Thom" and "Athiri Chirabara" all other songs were reused from Vijay Antony's own Tamil compositions.

References

External links
 

2012 films
2010s fantasy comedy films
Films shot in Tamil Nadu
Telugu films remade in other languages
Indian fantasy comedy films
2000s masala films
Films directed by Siva (director)
2010s Telugu-language films
Films scored by Vijay Antony
Films shot in Thailand
Films shot at Ramoji Film City
Films shot in Hyderabad, India
2012 comedy films
Yama in popular culture